The Movement of the National Left (Spanish: Movimiento de Izquierda Nacional, MIN) was a left-wing political party in Bolivia.

In 1978, Luis Sandoval Morón split from the Revolutionary Nationalist Movement and founded the Movement of the National Left. Sandoval Morón was a significant member of the MNR who ruled Santa Cruz Department during the 1950s.

The Movement of the National Left aims at being a political mass organization conducting "the struggle for national liberation from the imperialist yoke and for the building of a free and just society". It is hostile to "US imperialism" and Brazil's "expansionist sub-imperialism".

In 1978 and 1979 the Movement of the National Left took part in an electoral coalition Democratic and Popular Union backing Hernán Siles Zuazo. In 1980 it allied with the United Revolutionary Nationalist Movement and its candidate Guillermo Bedregal Gutiérrez.

References

Defunct political parties in Bolivia
Left-wing parties in Bolivia
Political parties established in 1978
Revolutionary Nationalist Movement breakaway groups